This is a list of Members of Parliament (MPs) elected to the Short Parliament in the reign of King Charles I in 1640.

The Short Parliament at Westminster began on 13 April 1640, and was held until 5 May. It sat for only 28 days, and was then dissolved. It was followed by the Long Parliament which began sitting in November 1640. Because of the short duration, several electoral disputes were not resolved before it was dissolved so in some instances there is an extra representative recorded.

List of constituencies and members

See also
List of parliaments of the United Kingdom
Short Parliament

Notes

References

Parliaments of Charles I of England
1640 in England
1640 in politics
1640
List